Merle Robbins   (September 12, 1911 – January 14, 1984) was an American barber from Reading, Ohio who invented the card game UNO. 

In 1971, he invented UNO to resolve an argument with his son Ray, a teacher, about the rules of Crazy Eights. The original decks were designed and made on the family dining room table. Then he and his family mortgaged their home to raise $8,000 and created the first 5,000 UNO decks to sell. At first, he sold them out of his barber shop, while his son Ray handed them out to his students. In 1972, he sold the rights to UNO to International Games for $50,000 plus royalties of 10 cents per copy.

Today, the game is produced by toy giant Mattel in 80 countries and has sold 151 million copies worldwide.

Merle Robbins was a barber in Milford, Ohio. He died in 1984 in Cincinnati.

References

External links

Boardgamegeek

1911 births
1984 deaths
American entertainment industry businesspeople
Uno (card game)
People from Reading, Ohio
People from Milford, Ohio